Tenacibaculum sediminilitoris is a Gram-negative and non-spore-forming bacterium from the genus of Tenacibaculum which has been isolated from tidal flat sediments from the Yellow Sea in Korea.

References

External links
Type strain of Tenacibaculum sediminilitoris at BacDive -  the Bacterial Diversity Metadatabase

Flavobacteria
Bacteria described in 2016